Gephyromantis luteus, commonly known as the white Folohy Madagascar frog, is a species of frog in the family Mantellidae. It is endemic to Madagascar. Its natural habitat is subtropical or tropical moist lowland forests. It is threatened by habitat loss.

References

luteus
Endemic fauna of Madagascar
Taxa named by John Hewitt (herpetologist)
Taxa named by Paul Ayshford Methuen
Amphibians described in 1913
Taxonomy articles created by Polbot